The 2009 Blue Square UK Open was the seventh year of the PDC darts tournament where, following numerous regional qualifying heats throughout Britain, players competed in a single elimination tournament to be crowned champion. The tournament was held at the Reebok Stadium in Bolton, England, between 4–7 June 2009 and has the nickname, "the FA Cup of darts" as a random draw is staged after each round until the final.

Phil Taylor won the title for the third time by defeating Colin Osborne 11–6 in the final.

2009 UK Open Regional Finals
There were eight regional final events staged between January and May 2009 to determine the UK Open Order of Merit Table. The tournament winners were:
11 January (North-East; Doncaster): Colin Lloyd 6–1 Colin Osborne
8 March (Scotland; Irvine): Robert Thornton 6–2 Dennis Priestley
15 March (North-West; Wigan): James Wade 6–3 Kevin McDine
22 March (South-East; Brentwood): Phil Taylor 6–4 Terry Jenkins
29 March (West Midlands; Coventry): Phil Taylor 6–5 Wayne Jones
12 April (South-West; Taunton): Phil Taylor 6–0 Andy Hamilton
19 April (East Midlands; Derby): Mark Walsh 6–5 Raymond van Barneveld
10 May (Wales; Newport): Jamie Caven 6–5 Alan Tabern

Format and qualifiers
The tournament features 129 players. As in previous years, eight regional UK Open events were staged across the UK where players winning are collated into the UK Open Order Of Merit. The top 96 players and ties in the list, who played a minimum of three events received a place at the final stages.

The Holsten qualifiers and the players outside the top 32 of the UK Open Order of Merit began the tournament on the Thursday night. They played down to 32 players, and they were joined by the top 32 of the UK Open Order of Merit the following night, to provide the competition's last 64. A random draw was made after each subsequent round.

32 players were due to have qualified from four Holsten Pils qualifiers held in Aylesbury, Batley, Birmingham and Salford. However, Peter Green had to withdraw for unknown reasons, thus meaning there were only 31 qualifiers present in Bolton.

Aylesbury
  Phil Currie 
  Steve Dolan
  Adrian Genery
  Peter Green
  John McGuirk 
  Steve Penney
  Stuart Pickles
  Coen Wiekamp
  Eddie Lovely

Batley
  Alan Davie 
  Glen Durrant
  Chris Hornby
  Stuart Monaghan
  David Smurthwaite 
  Gary Stevens
  Graham Usher
  Darren Weaver

Birmingham
  Paul Cook
  Mark Cox
  Johnny Haines
  Mike Langley
  Mark Layton
  Andy Pearce
  Andy Roberts
  Paul Rowley

Salford
  Kevin Beare 
  Andy Boulton
  Matthew Campbell
  Les Fitton
  Duane Garfield 
  Ken Mather
  Harry Robinson
  Derek Williams

Prize money

In addition, Holsten offered a £3,000 bonus to the Pub Qualifier to get the furthest into the tournament (shared by Ken Mather and Andy Roberts).

Draw
The draw for the preliminary, first and second rounds was made on 25 May, ahead of the 2009 Premier League Darts play-offs by Sid Waddell and Keith Deller.

Preliminary round
This match was the best of eleven legs, and was played on 4 June.

First round
 All matches were the best of eleven legs, and were played on 4 June.

Second round
 All matches were the best of eleven legs, and were played on 4 June.

† Mark Lawrence was given a bye into round three, as Paul Cook was disqualified.

Third round
 All matches were the best of seventeen legs, and were played on 5 June.

Fourth round
 All matches were the best of seventeen legs, and were played on 6 June.

Final stages

There was a draw after each round; this bracket has been compiled retrospectively.

See also
UK Open history of event and previous winners
2009 in darts includes extended results of Pro Tour events
PDC Pro Tour history of PDC "floor events"

References

External links
The official PDC page for the Blue Square UK Open

UK Open
UK Open Darts
UK Open
UK Open